= Platzerberg =

Mountain in Germany

Coordinates: 50°20′52″N 12°06′28″E

Highest point
- Elevation: 629 m (2,064 ft)

Geography
- Location: Saxony, Germany

Platzerberg is a mountain of Saxony, southeastern Germany.
